The N-terminal prohormone of brain natriuretic peptide (NT-proBNP or BNPT) is a prohormone with a 76 amino acid N-terminal inactive protein that is cleaved from the molecule to release brain natriuretic peptide.

Both BNP and NT-proBNP levels in the blood are used for screening, diagnosis of acute congestive heart failure (CHF) and may be useful to establish prognosis in heart failure, as both markers are typically higher in patients with worse outcome. The plasma concentrations of both BNP and NT-proBNP are also typically increased in patients with asymptomatic or symptomatic left ventricular dysfunction and is associated with coronary artery disease and myocardial ischemia.

Blood levels

There is no level of BNP that perfectly separates patients with and without heart failure.

In screening for congenital heart disease in pediatric patients, an NT-proBNP cut-off value of 91 pg/mL could differentiate an acyanotic heart disease (ACNHD) patient from a healthy patient with a sensitivity of 84% and specificity of 42%. On the other hand, an NT-proBNP cut-off value of 318 pg/mL is more appropriate in differing patients with congenital nonspherocytic hemolytic disease (CNHD) from healthy patients, with 94% sensitivity and 97% specificity. An NT-proBNP value of 408 pg/mL has been estimated to be 83% sensitive and 57% specific in differentiating patients with ACNHD from patients with CNHD.

Test usage in a clinical setting

Canada
While discussed in Canadian medical journals in the mid to late 2000s, the test is not widely used. It was only approved for use in Alberta in February 2012.

Test usage in the life insurance industry
The test has been widely used in the life insurance industry to screen applicants as part of the routine requirements when applying for a life insurance policy. It is also inexpensive and can be measured from blood samples routinely drawn as part of the application process. The test can be used to evaluate for a number of health conditions.

See also 
Brain natriuretic peptide

References

External links 
BNP and NT-proBNP at Lab Tests Online

Biomarkers
Peptide hormones